On Your Knees may refer to:

On Your Knees (EP), an EP by Great White
"On Your Knees" (song), a 1979 song by Grace Jones